Johnny Griffin's Studio Jazz Party is an album by jazz saxophonist Johnny Griffin which was recorded in 1960 and released on the Riverside label.

Reception

The AllMusic review by Scott Yanow stated the album was "performed before an invited and enthusiastic studio audience, who provided atmosphere. Babs Gonzales introduces several of the numbers, but proves to be an unnecessary presence. However, Griffin in particular plays quite well in this loose straight-ahead setting"

Track listing
 "Party Time" (Arnett Cobb) - 1:14   
 "Good Bait" (Count Basie, Tadd Dameron) - 12:24   
 "There Will Never Be Another You" (Mack Gordon, Harry Warren) - 8:20   
 "Toe-Tappin'" (David Burns) - 7:53   
 "You've Changed" (Bill Carey, Carl T. Fischer) - 7:37   
 "Low Gravy" (Babs Gonzales) - 8:06

Personnel
Johnny Griffin — tenor saxophone
Dave Burns - trumpet
Norman Simmons - piano
Victor Sproles - bass
Ben Riley - drums
Babs Gonzales - announcer

References 

1960 albums
Johnny Griffin albums
Albums produced by Orrin Keepnews
Riverside Records albums